Didonica is a genus of flowering plants belonging to the family Ericaceae.

Its native range is Central America.

Species:

Didonica crassiflora 
Didonica panamensis 
Didonica pendula 
Didonica subsessilis

References

Ericaceae
Ericaceae genera